The 1st Korea Drama Awards is an awards ceremony for excellence in television in South Korea. It was held in Jinju, South Gyeongsang Province in September 2007. The nominees were chosen from Korean dramas that aired from October 1, 2006 to September 30, 2007.

Nominations and winners
(Winners denoted in bold)

References

External links 
  

Korea Drama Awards
Korea Drama Awards
Korea Drama Awards